Masaba is an area in ward 3 of the town of Tarabo, in Rupganj Upazila, Narayanganj District, Bangladesh. According to the 2011 Bangladesh census, Masaba had 1,134 households and a population of 4,896.

References

Geography of Dhaka Division
Rupganj Upazila